The Alliance MMA Gym is an American mixed martial arts training facility located in Chula Vista, California and is home to a number of professional mixed martial artists who have found success in organizations such as the Ultimate Fighting Championship (UFC), World Extreme Cagefighting (WEC), Strikeforce and Bellator. The Alliance MMA Gym is one of the top professional MMA training camps.

History 
The Alliance MMA training facility was opened by former Ultimate Fighting Championship and current ONE Championship fighter Brandon Vera  in 2007, following his departure from their management team and position as a trainer at City Boxing in San Diego.

Notable fighters 
 Brandon Vera - Former One Championship Heavyweight Champion
 Joey Beltran - Former Bellator Light Heavyweight Title Challenger
 Jan Błachowicz - Former UFC Light Heavyweight Champion, Former KSW Light Heavyweight Champion
 Michael Chandler - Former Bellator Lightweight Champion (2 Time), Fought For Bellator Lightweight Championship 6 Times, Record; (4:2), Fought For Bellator Lightweight Interim Championship 1 Time, Record; (0:1) 
 Dominick Cruz - First UFC 2-Time Bantamweight Champion, 3 defenses, Former, Last WEC Bantamweight Champion, 2 defenses
 Phil Davis - Former Bellator Light Heavyweight Champion, First Bellator Light Heavyweight Grand Prix Champion, Former UFC Light Heavyweight Contender
 Cat Zingano - Current Bellator Women's Featherweight Contender, Former UFC Women's Bantamweight Contender, 1x title challenger
 Phil De Fries
 Omar de la Cruz 
 Tomasz Drwal 
 Wilson Reis
 Mike Easton 
 Danny Martinez
 Alexander Gustafsson - UFC Light Heavyweight Contender, 3x title contender
 Frank Shamrock - First UFC Middleweight (now Light Heavyweight) Champion, first Strikeforce Middleweight Champion, and first WEC Light Heavyweight Champion
 Chris Leben - First WEC Middleweight Champion, Former UFC Middleweight Contender
 K. J. Noons - Retired UFC Lightweight, Former EliteXC Lightweight Champion, Former Strikeforce Welterweight Challenger
 Jorge Ortiz 
 Ross Pearson - Current UFC Lightweight
 Rolando Perez 
 Viktor Pešta - Current UFC Heavyweight
 Ed Ratcliff 
 Jeremy Stephens - Current Professional Fighters League Lightweight, Former UFC Featherweight
 Kerry Vera
  Angela Hill - Current UFC  Strawweight

External links

References

Mixed martial arts training facilities
2007 establishments in California
Buildings and structures in Chula Vista, California